Calliano is a comune (municipality) in the Province of Asti in the Italian region Piedmont, located about  east of Turin and about  northeast of Asti.  
Calliano borders the following municipalities: Alfiano Natta, Asti, Castagnole Monferrato, Castell'Alfero, Grana, Penango, Portacomaro, Scurzolengo, and Tonco.

Twin towns — sister cities
Calliano is twinned with:

  Calliano, Italy 
  Callian, France

References

Cities and towns in Piedmont